Rabiul Hussain (31 January 1943 – 26 November 2019) was a Bangladeshi poet and architect. He was one of the trustees of the Bangladesh Liberation War Museum. He was awarded Bangla Academy Literary Award in 2009 for poetry. In recognition of his contribution to Bengali language and literature, the government of Bangladesh awarded him the country's second highest civilian award Ekushey Padak in 2018.

Early life
Hussain was born on 31 January 1943 at Rotidanga village in Shailkupa under Jhenaidah of the then British India (now Bangladesh). After completing his secondary and higher secondary education in Kushtia, he studied architecture at the East Pakistan University of Engineering Technology (now Bangladesh University of Engineering and Technology (BUET)). He graduated from BUET in 1968.

Awards
 Bangla Academy Literary Award (2009)
 Ekushey Padak (2018)

References

1943 births
2019 deaths
People from Jhenaidah District
Bangladesh University of Engineering and Technology alumni
Bangladeshi male poets
Bangladeshi architects
Recipients of the Ekushey Padak
Recipients of Bangla Academy Award